Badminton will be contested at the 2011 Summer Universiade from August 16 to August 22 at the Gymnasium of Shenzhen Institute of Information Technology in Shenzhen, China. Men's and women's singles, men's, women's, and mixed doubles, and mixed team events will be contested. The training venue was held at the Badminton Hall of Longgang Sports Center.

Medal summary

Medal table

Events

References

 
2011 Summer Universiade events
2011